Michael James McClennan (26 January 1944 – October 2019) was a New Zealand rugby league footballer and coach who played for the New Zealand national team And Michael was also known as one of the top Rugby League Coaches and Mentors of his decade.

Background
He is the father of Brian McClennan.

Playing career
McClennan played in the Auckland Rugby League premiership for the Ponsonby Ponies and represented the New Zealand national rugby league team in two Tests in 1971. He won the Tetley Trophy in 1970 as leading try-scorer in the Auckland Rugby League competition.

Coaching career
During the 1980s McClennan coached the Mt Albert Lions to six Auckland Rugby League Fox Memorial Grand finals, winning five. He was also the New Zealand national rugby league team assistant coach under Graham Lowe. In 1989 he moved to Northcote and won the Fox Memorial with them that year. In 1990 he was appointed the St. Helens head coach. He coached the team between February 1990 and December 1993.

McClennan also was the coach of the Tonga team at the 1995 World Cup. Tonga failed to win a match at the World Cup but earned respect after they narrowly lost to the New Zealand team by a single point. He was also the Auckland Warriors assistant coach in 1999.

In 2000 he served as the technical advisor to the South Africa team at the 2000 World Cup.

Disappearance and death
McClennan suffered from dementia and disappeared from his rest home at Orewa on 16 October 2019. His body was discovered six days later, on 22 October.

References

1944 births
2019 deaths
Auckland rugby league team players
Mount Albert Lions coaches
Mount Wellington Warriors players
New Zealand national rugby league team players
New Zealand rugby league coaches
New Zealand rugby league players
New Zealand Warriors coaches
Northcote Tigers coaches
Ponsonby Ponies players
Rugby league fullbacks
St Helens R.F.C. coaches
Tonga national rugby league team coaches